Bondan Prakoso (born May 8, 1982) is an Indonesian singer-songwriter, bass guitarist, and record producer. He is known as the former bassist of rock band Funky Kopral (1999–2003) and the lead singer of the rap rock collaboration band, Bondan Prakoso & Fade 2 Black (2005–2013). He has won several awards from Indonesian Music Awards with both Funky Kopral and his collaboration band, Bondan Prakoso & Fade 2 Black.

Biography

Early life
Bondan Prakoso was born on May 8, 1984. He is the second child of three children. Since 8 years old, Bondan had already been exposed to the music industry as a child singer. He emerged as a famous young popstar in early 1990s. Bondan released 8 albums in 1988–1995.

Funky Kopral
In the late 1990s, Bondan and his friends, Anggara Mulia (Angga), Bobbi Wibowo (Robbi), Kristo Perwira, and Arlonsy Miraldi (Onci), formed a rock band called Funky Kopral. Together, they released three albums in 1999–2003 with Universal Music record label. In 2002, Iman Taufik Rachman (Iman) come and replaced Onci as the guitarist. Eventually, the band broke up in late 2003. Years later, Funky Kopral has reformed, but with only a few remained from the original formation. The others had formed or joined other bands, such as: Iman with J-Rocks, and Bondan with his collaboration, Bondan Prakoso & Fade 2 Black.

Bondan Prakoso & Fade 2 Black
This is music project collaboration between a musician named Bondan Prakoso and the rap hip hop group Fade2Black; the members are Tito a.k.a. Titz, Ari a.k.a. Santoz, and Eza a.k.a. Lezzano.

In early 2002, Bondan Prakoso who is also well known by public as a bass player, who was also a former bass player in a Funk Stream band called Funky Kopral, and Tito a.k.a. Titz who is known as a rapper and has group called Fade2Black, often shared their thoughts and ideas to each other about music. They came from different backgrounds of music, Bondan Prakoso plays more likely in funk and rock music and Titz in rap and hip hop. These two campus mates from Faculty of Culture and Humaniora, deepin' in Dutch literature, are college friends on University of Indonesia, Depok.

By the late 2003, because of the needs and his desire in acknowledging music are getting more mature, deeper and freedom in creating this art, Bondan Prakoso had decided to go further as he decided to retire from their former band, Funky Kopral.

2004 was when Bondan came up with an idea to merge different kinds of music and combine them in a new package form of music, as in that mid year, he has asked Titz to join in a music project. Titz thought that it will be more strong with his group Fade2Black in joining in.

The situation is getting more varieties and more colorful as Bondan approved to involve this Hiphop group from Bogor, Fade2Black, in this project. Instead of only 1 rapper, this music project is combining 3 rappers, Tito a.k.a. Titz, Ari a.k.a. Santoz and Eza a.k.a. Lezano.

By the late 2004, they were starting to go further with this project and created various kinds of music with the touch of Rap, Rock, Funk as the elements. Bondan Prakoso is in-charge for the music instruments, looping, and arranging, while Fade2Black get more close to the lyrics.

The process took four months to complete and in August 2005, their first album with the title RESPECT released under the Sony BMG Music Indonesia. Since then, the album which contains many types of musics with rap as the basic vocal by TITZ, SANTOZ and LEZANO, while in other songs also joined BONDAN PRAKOSO on vocal in singing.

With this piece of arts, they received contribution and awards, such as:
 MTv Indonesia Exclusive artist in November, 2005
 MTv Advance Warning award in November, 2005
 Indonesian Music Award (AMI) 2006, as the best Rap album production.

In 2008, they were ready to break the Indonesian Music Industry with their more hard, impulsive, innovative forms of music. With their second album, named UNITY, and with their breakthrough single hit, "KERONCONG PROTOL".

With this new debut from their second album, they won the 2008 Indonesian Music Award (AMI) for the second time in a row for the Best Rap Album Production.

In 2010, they were back with their third album, FOR ALL. Hitting back the local music industry with the hit single "Ya Sudahlah".

Their album For All gave them more chances to reach more to the top of Indonesian music industry. Along with their hits single "Ya Sudahlah", Bondan Prakoso and Fade2Black succeed on gaining more eyes from the public over their existence by receiving 4× Platinum Award for RBT (Ring Back Tone) download and 5 times on the Twitter Trending Topics. With that also, they have won several local awards, such as:
 Most popular song 2011 on Anugerah Music TerDahsyat 2011 (local TV music program awards), "Ya Sudahlah".
 Most popular Artis/Grup R&B/Rap/Dance on Indosat Award 2011.
 Most popular R&B/Rap/Dance song on Indosat Awards 2011, "Kita Slamanya".

On their 3rd album, they launched 3 singles, "Ya Sudahlah", "Kita Slamanya" and their most latest single "Tetap Semangat".

In 2011, they were developing their skills and creativity on finishing their 4th album.

Discography

Studio albums
Funky Kopral
 1999: Funchopat
 2000: Funkadelic Rhythm and Distortion
 2003: Misteri Cinta

Bondan Prakoso & Fade 2 Black
 2005: Respect
 2007: Unity
 2010: For All
 2012: Respect & Unity For All
2014: Generasiku EP

References

External links
 Official website
 Bondan Prakoso & Fade 2 Black at SonyMusic.co.id
 Bondan Prakoso & Fade 2 Black at Billboard.com
 Bondan Prakoso & Fade 2 Black on Facebook
 Bondan Prakoso & Fade 2 Black on Twitter

Indonesian bass guitarists
Indonesian child singers
21st-century Indonesian male singers
Anugerah Musik Indonesia winners
Indonesian rock singers
Indonesian songwriters
Living people
1983 births
Male bass guitarists
21st-century bass guitarists